Railway modelling (UK, Australia, New Zealand, and Ireland) or model railroading (US and Canada) is a hobby in which rail transport systems are modelled at a reduced scale.

The scale models include locomotives, rolling stock, streetcars, tracks, signalling, cranes, and landscapes including: countryside, roads, bridges, buildings, vehicles, harbors, urban landscape, model figures, lights, and features such as rivers, hills, tunnels, and canyons.

The earliest model railways were the 'carpet railways' in the 1840s. The first documented model railway was the Railway of the Prince Imperial (French: Chemin de fer du Prince Impérial) built in 1859 by Emperor Napoleon III for his then 3-year-old son, also Napoleon, in the grounds of the Château de Saint-Cloud in Paris. It was powered by clockwork and ran in a figure-of-eight. Electric trains appeared around the start of the 20th century, but these were crude likenesses. Model trains today are more realistic, in addition to being much more technologically advanced. Today modellers create model railway layouts, often recreating real locations and periods throughout history. 

The world's oldest working model railway is a model designed to train signalmen on the Lancashire and Yorkshire Railway. It is located in the National Railway Museum, York, England and dates back to 1912. It remained in use until 1995. The model was built as a training exercise by apprentices of the company's Horwich Works and supplied with rolling stock by Bassett-Lowke.

General description 
Involvement ranges from possession of a train set to spending hours and large sums of money on a large and exacting model of a railroad and the scenery through which it passes, called a "layout". Hobbyists, called "railway modellers" or "model railroaders", may maintain models large enough to ride (see Live steam, Ridable miniature railway and Backyard railroad).

Modellers may collect model trains, building a landscape for the trains to pass through. They may also operate their own railroad in miniature. For some modellers, the goal of building a layout is to eventually run it as if it were a real railroad (if the layout is based on the fancy of the builder) or as the real railroad did (if the layout is based on a prototype). If modellers choose to model a prototype, they may reproduce track-by-track reproductions of the real railroad in miniature, often using prototype track diagrams and historic maps.

Layouts vary from a circle or oval of track to realistic reproductions of real places modelled to scale. Probably the largest model landscape in the UK is in the Pendon Museum in Oxfordshire, UK, where an EM gauge (same 1:76.2 scale as 00 but with more accurate track gauge) model of the Vale of White Horse in the 1930s is under construction. The museum also houses one of the earliest scenic models – the Madder Valley layout built by John Ahern. This was built in the late 1930s to late 1950s and brought in realistic modelling, receiving coverage on both sides of the Atlantic in the magazines Model Railway News and Model Railroader. Bekonscot in Buckinghamshire is the oldest model village and includes a model railway, dating from the 1930s. The world's largest model railroad in H0 scale is the Miniatur Wunderland in Hamburg, Germany.
Operations form an important aspect of rail transport modelling with many layouts being dedicated to emulating the operational aspects of a working railway. These layouts can become extremely complex with multiple routes, movement patterns and timetabled operation. The British outline model railway of Banbury Connections is one of the world's most complicated model railways.

Model railroad clubs exist where enthusiasts meet. Clubs often display models for the public. Models in these scales are usually hand-built and powered by live steam, or diesel-hydraulic, and the engines are often powerful enough to haul dozens of human passengers.

The Tech Model Railroad Club (TMRC) at MIT in the 1950s pioneered automatic control of track-switching by using telephone relays.

The oldest society is 'The Model Railway Club' (established 1910), near Kings Cross, London, UK. As well as building model railways, it has 5,000 books and periodicals. Similarly, 'The Historical Model Railway Society' at Butterley, near Ripley, Derbyshire specialises in historical matters and has archives available to members and non-members.

Scales and gauges 

The words scale and gauge seem at first interchangeable but their meanings are different. Scale is the model's measurement as a proportion to the original, while gauge is the measurement between the rails.

The most popular scales are: G scale, Gauge 1, O scale, S scale, HO scale (in Britain, the similar OO), TT scale, and N scale (1:160 in the United States, but 1:148 in the UK). HO and OO are the most popular. Popular narrow-gauge scales include Sn3, HOn3 and Nn3, which are the same in scale as S, HO and N except with a narrower spacing between the tracks (in these examples, a scale  instead of the  standard gauge).

The largest common scale is 1:8, with 1:4 sometimes used for park rides. G scale (Garden, 1:24 scale) is most popular for backyard modelling. It is easier to fit a G scale model into a garden and keep scenery proportional to the trains. Gauge 1 and Gauge 3 are also popular for gardens. O, S, HO, and N scale are more often used indoors.

At first, model railways were not to scale. Aided by trade associations such as the National Model Railroad Association (NMRA) and Normen Europäischer Modellbahnen (NEM), manufacturers and hobbyists soon arrived at de facto standards for interchangeability, such as gauge, but trains were only a rough approximation to the real thing. Official scales for the gauges were drawn up but not at first rigidly followed and not necessarily correctly proportioned for the gauge chosen. 0 (zero) gauge trains, for instance, operate on track too widely spaced in the United States as the scale is accepted as 1:48 whereas in Britain 0 gauge uses a ratio of 43.5:1 or 7 mm/1 foot and the gauge is near to correct. British OO standards operate on track significantly too narrow. This arose due to British locomotives and rolling stock being smaller than those found elsewhere, leading to an increase in scale to enable H0 scale mechanisms to be used. Most commercial scales have standards that include wheel flanges that are too deep, wheel treads that are too wide, and rail tracks that are too large. In H0 scale, the rail heights are codes 100, 87, 83, 70, 55, 53, and 40 -- the height in thousandths of an inch from base to railhead (so code 100 is a tenth of an inch and represents 156-pound rail).

Later, modellers became dissatisfied with inaccuracies and developed standards in which everything is correctly scaled. These are used by modellers but have not spread to mass-production because the inaccuracies and overscale properties of the commercial scales ensure reliable operation and allow for shortcuts necessary for cost control. The finescale standards include the UK's P4, and the even finer S4, which uses track dimensions scaled from the prototype. Check-rail and wing-rail clearances are similarly accurate. 

It gives a better appearance than OO though pointwork is not as close to reality as P4. It suits many where time and improved appearance are important. There is a small following of finescale OO which uses the same 16.5mm gauge as OO, but with the finer scale wheels and smaller clearances as used with EM- it is essentially 'EM-minus-1.7mm.'

Modules 
Many groups build modules, which are sections of layouts, and can be joined together to form a larger layout, for meetings or for special occasions. For each kind of module system, there is an interface standard, so that modules made by different participants may be connected, even if they have never been connected before. Many of these module types are listed in the Layout standards organizations section of this article.

Couplers and connectors 

In addition to different scales, there are also different types of couplers for connecting cars, which are not compatible with each other.

In HO, the Americans standardized on horn-hook, or X2F couplers. Horn hook couplers have largely given way to a design known as a working knuckle coupler which was popularized by the Kadee Quality Products Co., and which has subsequently been emulated by a number of other manufactures in recent years. Working knuckle couplers are a closer approximation to the "automatic" couplers used on the prototype there and elsewhere. Also in HO, the European manufacturers have standardized, but on a coupler mount, not a coupler: many varieties of coupler can be plugged in (and out) of the NEM coupler box. None of the popular couplers has any resemblance to the prototype three-link chains generally used on the continent.

For British modellers, whose most popular scale is OO, the normal coupler is a tension-lock coupler, which, again has no pretence of replicating the usual prototype three-link chain couplers. Bachmann and more recently Hornby have begun to offer models fitted with NEM coupler pockets. This theoretically enables modellers of British railways to substitute any other NEM362 coupler, though many Bachmann models place the coupler pocket at the wrong height. A fairly common alternative is to use representations of chain couplings as found on the prototype, though these require large radius curves to be used to avoid derailments.

Other scales have similar ranges of non-compatible couplers available. In all scales couplers can be exchanged, with varying degrees of difficulty.

Landscaping 

Some modellers pay attention to landscaping their layout, creating a fantasy world or modelling an actual location, often historic. Landscaping is termed "scenery building" or "scenicking".

Constructing scenery involves preparing a sub-terrain using a wide variety of building materials, including (but not limited to) screen wire, a lattice of cardboard strips, or carved stacks of expanded polystyrene (styrofoam) sheets. A scenery base is applied over the sub-terrain; typical base include casting plaster, plaster of Paris, hybrid paper-pulp (papier-mâché) or a lightweight foam/fiberglass/bubblewrap composite as in Geodesic Foam Scenery.

The scenery base is covered with substitutes for ground cover, which may be Static Grass or scatter.  Scatter or flock is a substance used in the building of dioramas and model railways to simulate the effect of grass, poppies, fireweed, track ballast and other scenic ground cover. Scatter used to simulate track ballast is usually fine-grained ground granite.  Scatter which simulates coloured grass is usually tinted sawdust, wood chips or ground foam.  Foam or natural lichen or commercial scatter materials can be used to simulate shrubbery.  An alternative to scatter, for grass, is static grass which uses static electricity to make its simulated grass actually stand up.

Buildings and structures can be purchased as kits, or built from cardboard, balsa wood, basswood, other soft woods, paper, or polystyrene or other plastic. Trees can be fabricated from materials such as Western sagebrush, candytuft, and caspia, to which adhesive and model foliage are applied; or they can be bought ready-made from specialist manufacturers. Water can be simulated using polyester casting resin, polyurethane, or rippled glass. Rocks can be cast in plaster or in plastic with a foam backing. Castings can be painted with stains to give colouring and shadows.

Weathering 
Weathering refers to making a model look used and exposed to weather by simulating dirt and wear on real vehicles, structures and equipment.  Most models come out of the box looking new, because unweathered finishes are easier to produce. Also, the wear a freight car or building undergoes depends not only on age but where it is used.  Rail cars in cities accumulate grime from building and automobile exhaust and graffiti, while cars in deserts may be subjected to sandstorms which etch or strip paint.  A model that is weathered would not fit as many layouts as a pristine model which can be weathered by its purchaser.

There are many weather techniques that include, but are not limited to, painting (by either drybrushing or an airbrush), sanding, breaking, and even the use of chemicals to cause corrosion.  Some processes become very creative depending on the skill of the modeller.  For instance several steps may be taken to create a rusting effect to ensure not only proper colouring, but also proper texture and lustre.

Weathering purchased models is common, at the least, weathering aims to reduce the plastic-like finish of scale models.  The simulation of grime, rust, dirt, and wear adds realism. Some modellers simulate fuel stains on tanks, or corrosion on battery boxes. In some cases, evidence of accidents or repairs may be added, such as dents or freshly painted replacement parts, and weathered models can be nearly indistinguishable from their prototypes when photographed appropriately.

Methods of power 

Static diorama models or "push along" scale models are a branch of model railways for unpowered locomotives, examples are Lone Star and Airfix models. Powered model railways are now generally operated by low voltage direct current (DC) electricity supplied via the tracks, but there are exceptions, such as Märklin and Lionel Corporation, which use alternating current (AC). Modern Digital Command Control (DCC) systems use alternating current. Other locomotives, particularly large models can use steam. Steam and clockwork driven engines are still sought by collectors.

Clockwork 
Most early models for the toy market were powered by clockwork and controlled by levers on the locomotive. Although this made control crude the models were large and robust enough that handling the controls was practical. Various manufacturers introduced slowing and stopping tracks that could trigger levers on the locomotive and allow station stops.

Electricity 
Three-rail
Early electrical models used a three-rail system with the wheels resting on a metal track with metal sleepers that conducted power and a middle rail which provided power to a skid under the locomotive. This made sense at the time as models were metal and conductive. Modern plastics were not available and insulation was a problem. In addition the notion of accurate models had yet to evolve and toy trains and track were crude tinplate. A variation on the three-rail system, Trix Twin, allowed two trains to be independently controlled on one track, before the advent of Digital Command Control.

Two-rail
As accuracy became important some systems adopted two-rail power in which the wheels were isolated from each other and the rails carried the positive and negative supply with the right rail carrying the positive potential.

Stud contact
Other systems such as Märklin instead used fine metal studs to replace the central rail, allowing existing three-rail models to use more realistic track.

Overhead line
Where the model is of an electric locomotive, it may be supplied by overhead lines, like the full-size locomotive. Before Digital Command Control became available, this was one way of controlling two trains separately on the same track. The electric-outline model would be supplied by the overhead wire and the other model could be supplied by one of the running rails. The other running rail would act as a common return.

Battery
Early electric trains ran on trackside batteries because few homes in the late 19th century and early 20th century had electricity. Today, inexpensive train sets running on batteries are again common but regarded as toys and seldom used by hobbyists. Batteries located in the model often power garden railway and larger scale systems because of the difficulty in obtaining reliable power supply through the outdoor rails. The high power consumption and current draw of large scale garden models is more easily and safely met with internal rechargeable batteries. Most large scale battery powered models use radio control.

Live steam 
Hornby Railways produce live steam locomotives in OO, based on designs first arrived at by an amateur modeller. Other modellers have built live steam models in HO/OO, OO9 and N, and there is one in Z in Australia.

Internal combustion 
Occasionally gasoline-electric models, patterned after real diesel-electric locomotives, come up among hobbyists and companies like Pilgrim Locomotive Works have sold such locomotives. Large-scale petrol-mechanical and petrol-hydraulic models are available but unusual and pricier than the electrically powered versions.

Scratch building 

Modern manufacturing techniques can allow mass-produced models to cost-effectively achieve a high degree of precision and realism. In the past this was not the case and scratch building was very common. Simple models are made using cardboard engineering techniques. More sophisticated models can be made using a combination of etched sheets of brass and low temperature castings. Parts that need machining, such as wheels and couplings are purchased.

Etched kits are still popular, still accompanied by low temperature castings. These kits produce models that are not covered by the major manufacturers or in scales that are not in mass production. Laser machining techniques have extended this ability to thicker materials for scale steam and other locomotive types. Scratch builders may also make silicone rubber moulds of the parts they create, and cast them in various plastic resins (see Resin casting), or plasters. This may be done to save duplication of effort, or to sell to others. Resin "craftsman kits" are also available for a wide range of prototypes.

Control 

The first clockwork (spring-drive) and live steam locomotives ran until out of power, with no way for the operator to stop and restart the locomotive or vary its speed. The advent of electric trains, which appeared commercially in the 1890s, allowed control of the speed by varying the current or voltage. As trains began to be powered by transformers and rectifiers more sophisticated throttles appeared, and soon trains powered by AC contained mechanisms to change direction or go into neutral gear when the operator cycled the power. Trains powered by DC can change direction by reversing polarity.

Electricity permits control by dividing the layout into isolated blocks, where trains can be slowed or stopped by lowering or cutting power to a block. Dividing a layout into blocks permits operators to run more than one train with less risk of a fast train catching and hitting a slow train. Blocks can also trigger signals or other accessories, adding realism or whimsy. Three-rail systems often insulate one of the common rails on a section of track, and use a passing train to complete the circuit and activate an accessory.

Many layout builders are choosing digital operation of their layouts rather than the more traditional DC design. Of the several competing systems, the command system offered by the majority of manufacturers in 2020 was a variant of Digital Command Control (DCC). The advantages of DCC are that track voltage is constant (usually in the range of 20 volts AC) and the command throttle sends a signal to small circuit cards, or decoders, hidden inside the piece of equipment which control several functions of an individual locomotive, including speed, direction of travel, lights, smoke and various sound effects. This allows more realistic operation in that the modeller can operate independently several locomotives on the same stretch of track. Several manufacturers also offer software that can provide computer-control of DCC layouts.

In large scales, particularly for garden railways, radio control and DCC in the garden have become popular.

Model railway manufacturers 

 Accurail
 Accurascale
 Airfix
 Acme
 American Flyer
 American Z Lines
 Aristo-Craft Trains
 Arnold
 Associated Hobby Manufacters (AHM) (defunct)
 Athearn
 Atlas Model Railroad
 Auhagen
 Auscision
 Austrains
 Austrains NEO
 Bachmann Industries
 Bassett-Lowke
 Bavaria
 
 Bing
 Bowser Manufacturing
 Branchline (Bachmann Branchline)
 Broadway Limited Imports (BLI)
 Con-Cor
 Dapol
 Darstaed
 Doepke (defunct)
 DJH Models and Kits
 DJ Models Ltd
 Exley
 Eggerbahn
 ExactRail
 Eureka Models
 Faller
 Ferris (defunct)
 Fleischmann
 Frateschi
 Fulgurex
 G .& R. Wrenn Ltd
 Golden Age Models Limited
 Graham Farish ("Grafar")
 Great West Models
 Gützold
 HAG
 Hartlan Locomotive Works
 Haskell
 Heljan
 Herpa
 Hornby Railways
 Ibertren
 Intermountain
 International Hobby Corp.
 Irish Railway Models
 Ives Manufacturing Company (defunct 1928)
 Jouef
 Kadee
 Kato Precision Railroad Models
 Kemtron Corporation (defunct 1964)
 Klein Modellbahn
 Kleinbahn
 Kres (model railway)
 Kuehn-modell
 Lego train
 Lemaco
 
 
 Lesney (Matchbox)
 Lehmann Gross Bahn
 Life-Like
 Liliput (owned by Bachmann Industries)
 Lima
 Lionel, LLC
 LS Models
 Marx
 Mainline
 Mantua, later Tyco Toys (both defunct by 2001)
 Märklin
 Mehano
 Merkur (toy)
 Merten (model railway)
 Micro-Trains Line
 Minitrains
 Mistral Train Models
 Model Power
 Modemo (Hasegawa)
 MTH Electric Trains
 Noch
 Norsk Modelljernbane (NMJ)
 Oxford Rail
 Peco
 Piko
 Playcraft (defunct)
 Playmobil
 Powerline model railway
 Rapido
 Rapido Trains (Canada)
 REE Modèles
 Rio Grande Models, Ltd.
 Rivarossi
 Roco
 Rokal
 Rokuhan
 ScaleTrains
 Slater's Plastikard
 Seven
 Southern Rail Models
 SDS Models
 SceneryScapers
 Stewart Hobbies
 Tenmille
 Tenshodo
 Tomix
 
 Tillig
 Bob's Hobbies and Models (Trainorama)
 Tri-ang Railways
 Trix/Minitrix
 USA Trains
 Varney
 Viessmann
 Vitrains
 Vollmer
 Von Stetina Artworks
 Wiking
 Walthers
 Williams
 Woodland Scenics
 Worsley Works
 Wuiske

Magazines

Layout standards organizations 
Several organizations exist to set standardizations for connectibility between individual layout sections (commonly called "modules"). This is so several (or hundreds, given enough space and power) people or groups can bring together their own modules, connect them together with as little trouble as possible, and operate their trains. Despite different design and operation philosophies, different organizations have similar goals; standardized ends to facilitate connection with other modules built to the same specifications, standardized electricals, equipment, curve radii.
ausTRAK, N Scale, two-track main with hidden third track (can be used as NTRAK's third main, as a return/continuous loop, or hidden yard/siding/on-line storage). Australian scenery and rolling stock modelled in Standard Gauge.
FREMO a European-based organisation focusing on a single-track line, HO Scale. Also sets standards for N Scale modules. Standards are considerably more flexible in module shape than NTRAK, and has expanded over the years to accommodate several scenery variations.
Free-mo Originally developed by the San Luis Obispo Model Railroad Club in 1995 (California), it has grown across North America and is expanding across the world. The objective of the Free-mo Standard is to provide a platform for prototype modelling in a flexible, modular environment. Free-mo modules not only provide track to operate realistic models, but also emphasize realistic, plausible scenery; realistic, reliable trackwork; and operations. Free-Mo was designed to go beyond the traditional closed-loop set-up in creating a truly universal "free-form" modular design that is operations-oriented and heavily influenced by prototype railroading. This is emphasized in the Free-mo motto, "More than Just a Standard".
MOROP, European Union of Model Railroad and Railroad Fans, the European standardization organisation.
NMRA, National Model Railroad Association, the largest organization devoted to the development, promotion, and enjoyment of the hobby of model railroading.
N-orma, Polish N-scale (1:160) modules organization.
NTRAK, standardized three-track (heavy operation) mainline with several optional branchlines. Focuses on standard gauge, but also has specifications for narrow gauge. Due to its popularity, it can be found in regional variations, most notably the imperial-to-metric measurement conversions. Tends to be used more for "unattended display" than "operation".
oNeTRAK, operationally similar to FREMO, standardises around a single-track mainline, with modules of varying sizes and shapes. Designed with the existing NTRAK spec in mind, is fully compatible with such modules.
Sipping and Switching Society of NC is a society/association of individuals which has developed a system of HO modules, which feature lightweight waffle construction using 5 mm lauan plywood underlayment and an interface which depends on using a metal template to locate  pegs to mate to 1-inch holes in the adjoining module. The rails of the tracks are positioned in an exact relationship with the pegs. The rails come up to the end of the modules, so that the rails on adjacent modules do not need joiner track, but depend on the accuracy of the placement of the rails to allow trains to pass from one section to another. This style of module allows for very quick set-up, compared with module systems that use joiner tracks.
sTTandard, Polish TT-scale (1:120) modules organization.
It uses a specific track interface, which has joiners which hold the modules together, which enables quick setting up and taking down.
Z-Bend Track, uses a double-track mainline running down both sides of a module. Modules can be of any length or width in the middle and any overall shape. The "standard" called Z-Bend Track applies only to the last  of the module's interface to other modules, the electrical interface and the module height.

In popular culture

 In the 1990 film Back to the Future III, Doc brown builds a "crude" electrified model rail "not to scale" to demonstrate his time travel experiment to Marty in 1885. 
 In Hinterland Season 1, Episode 4 ("The Girl in the Water"), a semi-recluse who lives and works at Borth railway station maintains a model train set with custom made components; the set and certain components contribute to a death as well as provide important clues to a murder investigation. During the investigation, DCI Tom Mathias reveals that his late brother was a model train aficionado.
 In The Sopranos, Bobby Baccalieri is a model train aficionado. He is shown wearing an engineer's cap while playing with model trains in his garage. 
 In The Simpsons, Reverend Lovejoy is often depicted playing with his model trains when not on ecumenical duty, often while wearing a conductor's uniforn and hat.
 In Trailer Park Boys, Season 7 Episode 4, "Friends of the Dead", heavy metal singer Sebastian Bach is a featured guest at the Bangor model train convention and is introduced as "our Competitive Model Train World Champion". He expresses a dislike of alleged rival model train competitor Patrick Swayze. Attendees at the family event are shocked by Sebastian's use of obscenities as he attempts to work the crowd in a rock concert fashion shouting, "I know, I just know, that there are some great f**king trains here in Bangor!"

See also 

Brass model
Great American Train Show
Lego train
List of model railroad clubs
Model airport
Plasticville
Rail transport modelling scales
Rail transport modelling standards
Scale model
Standard gauge in Model railways
Train game
Wide gauge in Model railways

 Displays and famous layouts

Carnegie Science Center's Miniature Railroad & Village in Pittsburgh
Clemenceau Heritage Museum, elaborate model railroad display depicts the seven railroads that operated in the Upper Verde Valley of Arizona, 1895–1953
Gorre & Daphetid
The Great Train Story exhibit at Museum of Science and Industry (Chicago)
Miniatur Wunderland in Hamburg
National Toy Train Museum
Northlandz
San Diego Model Railroad Museum
The Toy Train Depot – A museum dedicated to the history of scale model railroading in Alamogordo, New Mexico
Virginian and Ohio
Výtopna

 Groups dedicated to railway modelling

 Historical Model Railway Society (UK)
 National Model Railroad Association (USA)
 Sydney Model Railway Exhibition

References

External links 

The National Model Railroad Association, USA – the largest model railroad organization in the world
The Model Railway Club, UK – the oldest known society in the world – established 1910
Associazione Ferrovie Siciliane – AFS (Messina – IT) – One of the most important group of rail enthusiasts end railways modellers active in Sicily and all over Italy founded in 2006